Ouratea brevicalyx is a shrub in the family Ochnaceae, originating in Venezuela.

Description 

Ouratea brevicalyx is a shrub that is 2 to 5 meters tall when mature, with green to lighter green leaves on the underside, elliptical 7 to 10 cm long and 3 to 4.5 cm wide. The flowers have a yellowish calyx, a bright yellow corolla, stamens and a yellow pistil.

Location 

References 

brevicalyx
Flora of Venezuela